Bolton and Undercliffe is an electoral ward in the City of Bradford Metropolitan District Council, England.
The population of the ward at the 2011 Census was 16,365. Bolton and Undercliffe covers the area east of Bradford Beck, between Shipley & Wrose to the north and central Bradford to the south. It is a largely urban area.

Bolton 

Bolton was a former village north of Bradford, but merged with Bradford in the 19th century.
Bolton is made of localities such as Bolton Outlanes, Bolton Villas, Bolton Woods, and Swain House.

Bolton is similar in meaning to Bolton, Greater Manchester; its name is from Old English bothl/boōl-tun "village with buildings".
The name was recorded as Boltetone in 1186.

Landmarks 

There are a number of listed buildings in Bolton.
On Idle Road in Bolton Outlanes there is Ivy Hall, a small 17th century hall
and Ivy Place, a mid 18th century house now subdivided.
Down Myers Lane (formerly named Owl Lane) in Bolton Outlanes is Hodgson Fold, a group of 17th century buildings.
On Bolton Lane there is Walnut Cottage and the 18th century Walnut Tree Farmhouse and barn.
Also on Bolton Lane is Bolton First School a church school dating from circa 1860.
On Lister Lane is Bolton House a former modest country house,
and there are listed park lodges, memorials and sculptures in Peel Park.
In Wrose is Bolton Old Hall, a timber framed building largely rebuilt in 1672, and an attached cottage.

There are some five public houses scattered throughout Bolton
and in the north west of Bolton is Bolton Woods Quarry a large stone quarry near Gaisby.

Churches

On Bolton Road is the Grade II listed Church of Saint James
and Bolton Methodist Church is further up Bolton Road in Bolton Outlanes.

Undercliffe 

Undercliffe means "below the cliff", referring to a village below a hill-spur.
The name was recorded as Indreclif in 1038.
Over time Undercliffe has moved uphill and encroached into Eccleshill.

History 

The Dudley Hill to Killinghall turnpike of 1804 came through Undercliffe, and the former Robin Hood public house was a toll office for the turnpike.
The turnpike still exists in the area as Killinghall Road to Bradford Moor and as Harrogate Road after a name change from Killinghall Road.

Cinema history

The 750 seat purpose-built Oxford Cinema on Dudley Hill Road was of a stone construction, and opened in 1914.
Sound was installed by 1930 and it closed briefly again in 1955 for refurbishment.
In 1962 it became a bingo club for three days of the week and a cinema the rest.
It closed temporarily for alterations in 1965 but closed permanently as a cinema early the next year reopening as a bingo club, now the Oxford Bingo and Social Club.
The bingo hall was destroyed in a fire in 2021 during a COVID-19 lock-down and quickly demolished.

The Coronet Cinema on Otley Road near Peel Park was purpose-built and opened in 1923.
For many years it was known as the Coronet Picture House.
Sound was installed around 1930 and a new wide screen in 1954.
The cinema suffered a serious fire in 1955 and after recovering closed finally in 1958.
The building was stripped and re-purposed as a wholesale food distribution warehouse but was destroyed by fire in 2003 and had to be quickly demolished.
A terrace of new houses now stand on the site.

The purpose-built brick and stone Tennyson Cinema was located to the south between Dacre Street, North Wing and Otley Road.
and opened in 1923 as the 1166 seat Tennyson Picture House.
Sound was installed in 1930, and in 1954 Cinemascope was installed while seating was further reduced to 1095.
The Tennyson Cinema closed in 1961.
The premises reopened as the Tennyson Bingo and Social Club, but later the building was demolished for road widening.

Landmarks 

In the south of Undercliffe is Peel Park a public park named after prime minister Sir Robert Peel.
Also in the south of Undercliffe is Bradford (Undercliffe) Cemetery.
The houses/small mansions of Guy's Cliffe on nearby Undercliffe Lane dating from circa 1850 are listed buildings
as are several memorials in Undercliffe Cemetery.
There is only one public house remaining in Undercliffe after the loss of the Hare and Hounds, the Green Man and the Robin Hood.

Churches

On Otley Road stands Saint Andrew's Methodist Church and Saint Augustine's Church.

Sports 

Undercliffe Cricket Club, established in 1875, has a cricket ground on Intake Road near Fagley. Undercliffe joined the Bradford Cricket League when it was formed in 1903 with twelve clubs and is one of only two (Undercliffe and Bankfoot) of the inaugural twelve that are current members.

Councillors 

Bolton and Undercliffe Ward is represented by three councillors from the Labour party: Suhail Choudhry, Simon Cunningham and Julie Humphreys 

 indicates seat up for re-election.

Notable people 

James Joseph Magennis was awarded a Victoria Cross in the Second World War for operations involving X-Craft midget submarines in attacks on Axis ships.  He moved to live in Swain House in the 1960s.

Actor Edward Peel attended schools in Swain House.
He appeared in the Dragonfire series of the science fiction series Doctor Who.

Barbara Jane Harrison – the first and, to date, only female recipient in peacetime of the George Cross medal for bravery was born at a house on Kingsdale Crescent. A Bradford Civic Society blue plaque to commemorate Barbara was unveiled at Bradford City Hall in 2019 and installed near to Barbara's birthplace on Bolton Road, at the junction with Kingsdale Crescent.

See also
Listed buildings in Bradford (Bolton and Undercliffe Ward)

References

External links 

 BBC election results
 Council ward profile
 A Vision of Britain through Time
 Bolton History Trail

Wards of Bradford